Opuntia gosseliniana, commonly known as the violet pricklypear, is a species of cactus that is native to Pima County, Arizona in the United States and Baja California, Chihuahua, and Sonora in Mexico.

Like most prickly pears, the pads are flat.  Unlike most prickly pears, they have a violet, pink, or red tinge, hence the name.  The cactus reaches mature heights of one to five feet and blooms either yellow or red.

Taxonomy
Different authorities disagree on the division of plants into Opuntia chlorotica, Opuntia violacea, Opuntia gosseliniana, Opuntia macrocentra, and perhaps others.  To complicate the issue, there are numerous natural hybrids between species.

Synonyms
Opuntia chlorotica Engelm. & Bigelow var. gosseliniana (A. Weber) Ferguson 
Opuntia violacea Engelm. var. gosseliniana (A. Weber) L. Benson
Opuntia chlorotica Engelm. & Bigelow var. santa-rita Griffiths

Varieties
O. gosseliniana var. duraznilla
O. gosseliniana var. santa-rita (also known as Opuntia santa-rita)

Distribution

The above-mentioned taxonomic issues complicate any attempt to describe the distribution of particular varieties or species.  O. gosseliniana is especially known from Mexico, but has been reported from Arizona.

References

External links
Wikispecies Page
USDA PLANTS Profile for Opuntia gosseliniana
USDA PLANTS Profile for Opuntia santa-rita

gosseliniana
Cacti of Mexico
Cacti of the United States
Flora of the Chihuahuan Desert
Flora of the Sonoran Deserts
Flora of Baja California
Flora of Chihuahua (state)
Flora of Sonora
Flora of Arizona
Flora of New Mexico
North American desert flora